1908 in Argentine football saw Belgrano AC win its 3rd. title, ending a run of three consecutive championships for Alumni.

In International football, Argentina won Copa Newton and Copa Lipton. On 13 September 1908, in the Copa Newton game against Uruguay Argentina wore the light blue and white stripes ("Albiceleste") for the first time.

Primera División

The 1908 championship was reduced from 11 to 10 teams, with each team playing the other twice.

Final standings

 Estudiantes (BA) was docked 2 points.
 San Martín was docked 2 points and was relegated at the end of the tournament.
 Nacional (Floresta) was disaffiliated by the Association due to the poor conditions of its stadium, according to the rules. The team had played only 2 matches.

Lower divisions

Primera B
Champion: River Plate

Primera C
Champion: Banfield

Domestic cups

Copa de Honor Municipalidad de Buenos Aires
Champion: Quilmes

Final

Copa de Competencia Jockey Club
Champion: Alumni

Final

International cups

Tie Cup
Champion:  Alumni

Final

Copa de Honor Cousenier
Champions:  Wanderers

Final

Argentina national team
Argentina retained both Copa Lipton and Copa Newton in 1908, although the squad was later beaten by Uruguay in the inaugural Copa Premier Honor Argentino. Argentina also embarked on a tour of Brazil in August 1908 where the team won six and drew one of the seven games played in 13 days.

Copa Lipton

Copa Newton

Copa Premier Honor Argentino

Friendly matches

References

 
Seasons in Argentine football